The free-market economy of Sri Lanka was worth $84 billion by nominal gross domestic product (GDP) in 2019 and $296.959 billion by purchasing power parity (PPP). The country had experienced an annual growth of 6.4 percent from 2003 to 2012, well above its regional peers. This growth was driven by the growth of non-tradable sectors, which the World Bank warned to be both unsustainable and unequitable. Growth has slowed since then. In 2019 with an income per capita of 13,620 PPP Dollars or 3,852 (2019) nominal US dollars, Sri Lanka was re-classified as a lower middle income nation with the population around 22 million (2021) by the World Bank from a previous upper middle income status.

Sri Lanka has met the Millennium Development Goal (MDG) target of halving extreme poverty and is on track to meet most of the other MDGs, outperforming other South Asian countries. Sri Lanka's poverty headcount index was 4.1% by 2016. Since the end of the three-decade-long Sri Lankan Civil War, Sri Lanka has begun focusing on long-term strategic and structural development challenges. It strives to transition to an upper middle-income country.

Overview
Services accounted for 58.2% of Sri Lanka's economy in 2019 up from 54.6% in 2010, industry 27.4% up from 26.4% a decade earlier and agriculture 7.4%. Though there is a competitive export agricultural sector, technological advances have been slow to enter the protected domestic sector. Sri Lanka is the largest solid and industrial tyres manufacturing centre in the world and has an apparel sector which is moving up the value chain. But rising trade protection over the past decade has also caused concern over the resurgence of inward looking policies.

In services, ports and airports are genarate income to the country's newfound status as a shipping and aviation hub. Port of Colombo is the largest transshipment hub in South Asia. There is a growing software and information technology sector, which is competitive and is open to global competition. Tourism is a fast expanding area. Lonely Planet named Sri Lanka the best destination to visit in 2019 and Travel+Leisure the best island. Sri Lanka's top export destinations are the United States, United Kingdom and India. China, India and the UAE are the main import partners.

With the onset of the COVID-19 pandemic, lingering concerns over Sri Lanka's slowing growth, money printing and government debt has spilled over into a series of sovereign rating downgrades. Import controls and import substitution have intensified after heightened monetary instability coming from debt monetization.
Sri Lanka has been named among the top 10 countries in the world in its handling of the COVID-19 pandemic. In 2021, the Sri Lankan Government officially declared the worst economic crisis in the country in 73 years.  Sri Lanka said most foreign debt repayments had been suspended from April 12, after two years of money printing to support tax cuts, ending an unblemished record of debt service.

Economic history

Early history

Sri Lanka has a long history as a trading hub as a result of being located at the centre of east–west trade and irrigated agriculture in the hinterland, which is known from historical texts surviving within the island and from accounts of foreign travellers. The island has irrigation reservoirs called tanks built by ancient Kings starting after Indo-Aryan migration, many of which survive to this day. They form part of an irrigation system interlinked with more modern constructions.

Faxian (also Fa Hsien) a Chinese Monk who travelled to India and Sri Lanka around 400 BC, writes of existing legends at his time of merchants from other countries trading with native tribal peoples in the island before Indo-Aryan settlement.  "The country which originally had no human inhabitants but was occupied by spirits and nagas (serpent worshipers) with which merchants of various countries carried on a trade," Faxian wrote in 'A Record of Buddhistic Kingdoms'. He writes of precious stones and pearl fisheries with a 30% tax by the king.

The monk had embarked "in a large merchant vessel" from India to arrive in the island. To go back to China he "took passage in a large merchantman on board which were more than 200 men", ran into a storm where the merchants were forced to throw part of the cargo overboard and arrived at Java-dvipa (Indonesia), showing Sri Lanka had active coastal and long distance maritime trade links.

Cosmas Indicopleustes (Indian Voyager), a merchant/monk from Alexandria of Egypt, who visited the Indian sub-continent in the 6th century, wrote in detail about Sri Lanka as a centre of commerce, referring to the island as Taprobane and Sieladiba.

"The island being, as it is, in a central position, is much frequented by ships from all parts of India and from Persia and Ethiopia, and it likewise sends out many of its own," he wrote in Christian Topography.  "And from the remotest countries, I mean Tzinista [China] and other trading places, it receives silk, aloes, cloves, sandalwood and other products, and these again are passed on to marts on this side, such as Male [Malabar or South West Indian coast] ... and to Calliana [Kalyana]... This same Sielediba then, placed as one may say, in the centre of the Indies and possessing the hyacinth [sapphire] receives ... and in turn exports to them, and is thus itself a great seat of commerce."

Independence to 1977

Sri Lanka was ahead of many Asian nations and had economic and social indicators comparable to Japan when it gained independence from the British in 1948.

Sri Lanka's social indicators were considered "exceptionally high".  Literacy was already 21.7% by the late 19th century. A Malaria eradication policy of 1946 had cut the death rate from 20 per thousand in 1946 to 14 by 1947. Life expectancy at birth of a Sri Lankan in 1948 at 54 years was just under Japan's 57.5 years. Sri Lanka's infant mortality rate in 1950 was 82 deaths per thousand live births, Malaysia 91 and Philippines 102.

With its strategic location in the Indian Ocean Sri Lanka was expected to have a better chance than most other Asian neighbors to register a rapid economic take-off and had "appeared to be one of the most promising new nations." But the optimism in 1948 had dimmed by 1960, due to wrong economic policies and mismanagement.

East Asia was gradually overtaking Sri Lanka.  In 1950 Sri Lanka's un-adjusted school enrolment ratio as a share of the 5-19 year age group was 54%, India 19%, Korea 43% and the Philippines 59%.  But by 1979 Sri Lanka's school enrollment rate was 74%, but the Philippines had improved to 85% and Korea was 94%.

Sri Lanka had inherited a stable macro-economy at independence. A central bank was set up and Sri Lanka became a member of the IMF entering the Bretton Woods system of currency pegs on August 29, 1950. By 1953 exchange controls were tightened with a new law.

The economy was then progressively controlled and relaxed in response to foreign exchange crises as monetary and fiscal policies deteriorated. Controls and restrictions in 1961-64 were followed by partial liberalization in 1965–70. Controls were continued after a devaluation in the wake of 1967 Sterling Crisis. Controls were tightened from 1970 to 1977 alongside the collapse of the Bretton Woods system. "In sum it was a story of tightening partial relaxing, and again tightening the trade regime and associated areas to over a perceived foreign exchange crisis," writes economist Saman Kelegama in 'Development in Independent Sri Lanka what went wrong'. "In the early 1960s strategy for dealing with the foreign exchange crisis was the gradual isolation of the economy from external market forces. It was the beginning of a standard import-substitution industrial regime with all the controls and restrictions associated with such a regime. Expropriation and state intervention in economic activities was common."

In 1960 Sri Lanka's (then Ceylon) per capita GDP was 152 dollars, Korea 153, Malaysia 280, Thailand 95, Indonesia 62, Philippines 254, Taiwan 149.  But by 1978 Sri Lanka's per capita GDP was 226, Malaysia 588, Indonesia 370 and Taiwan 505.

The 1970s also saw an uprising in the south from the JVP insurrection, and the roots of a civil war in the North and the East.

Post 1977 period

In 1977, Colombo abandoned statist economic policies and its import substitution industrialisation policy for market-oriented policies and export-oriented trade. Sri Lanka would after that be known to handle dynamic industries such as food processing, textiles and apparel, food and beverages, telecommunications, and insurance and banking. In the 1970s, the share of the middle class increased.

Between 1977 and 1994 the country came under UNP rule in which under President J.R Jayawardana Sri Lanka began to shift away from a socialist orientation in 1977. Since then, the government has been deregulating, privatizing, and opening the economy to international competition. In 2001, Sri Lanka faced bankruptcy, with debt reaching 101% of GDP. The impending currency crisis was averted after the country reached a hasty ceasefire agreement with the LTTE and brokered substantial foreign loans. After 2004 the UPFA government has concentrated on mass production of goods for domestic consumption such as rice, grain and other agricultural products.
however twenty-five years of civil war slowed economic growth, diversification and liberalisation, and the political group Janatha Vimukthi Peramuna (JVP) uprisings, especially the second in the early 1980s, also caused extensive upheavals.

Following the quelling of the JVP insurrection, increased privatization, economic reform, and the stress on export-oriented growth helped improve the economic performance, increasing GDP growth to 7% in 1993. By 1996 plantation crops made up only 20% of exports (compared with 93% in 1970), while textiles and garments accounted for 63%. GDP grew at an annual average rate of 5.5% throughout the 1990s until a drought and a deteriorating security situation lowered growth to 3.8% in 1996.

The economy rebounded in 1997–98 with a growth of 6.4% and 4.7% – but slowed to 3.7% in 1999. For the next round of reforms, the central bank of Sri Lanka recommends that Colombo expand market mechanisms in nonplantation agriculture, dismantle the government's monopoly on wheat imports, and promote more competition in the financial sector. Economic growth has been uneven in the ensuing years as the economy faced a multitude of global and domestic economic and political challenges. Overall, average annual GDP growth was 5.2% over 1991–2000.

In 2001, however, GDP growth was negative 1.4% – the first contraction since independence. The economy was hit by a series of global and domestic economic problems and was affected by terrorist attacks in Sri Lanka and the United States. The crises also exposed the fundamental policy failures and structural imbalances in the economy and the need for reforms. The year ended in parliamentary elections in December, which saw the election of United National Party to Parliament, while Sri Lanka Freedom Party retained the presidency.

During the short-lived peace process from 2002 to 2004, the economy benefited from lower interest rates, a recovery in domestic demand, increased tourist arrivals, a revival of the stock exchange, and increased foreign direct investment (FDI). In 2002, the economy experienced a gradual recovery. During this period Sri Lanka has been able to reduce defense expenditures and begin to focus on getting its large, public sector debt under control. In 2002, economic growth reached 4%, aided by strong service sector growth. The agricultural sector of the economy staged a partial recovery. Total FDI inflows during 2002 were about $246 million

The Mahinda Rajapakse government halted the privatization process and launched several new companies as well as re-nationalising previous state owned enterprises, one of which the courts declared that privatization is null and void. Some state-owned corporations became overstaffed and less efficient, making huge losses with series of frauds being uncovered in them and nepotism rising. During this time, the EU revoked GSP plus preferential tariffs from Sri Lanka due to alleged human rights violations, which cost about US$500 million a year.

The resumption of the civil-war in 2005 led to a steep increase defense expenditures. The increased violence and lawlessness also prompted some donor countries to cut back on aid to the country.

A sharp rise in world petroleum prices combined with the economic fallout from the civil war led to inflation that peaked at 20%.

Post-civil war period

Pre-2009, there was a continuing cloud over the economy with the civil war and fighting between the Government of Sri Lanka and the LTTE; however, the war ended with a resounding victory for the Sri Lankan Government on 19 May 2009 with the total elimination of the LTTE.

As the civil war ended in May 2009 the economy started to grow at a higher rate of 8.0% in the year 2010 and reached 9.1% in 2012, mostly due to the boom in non-tradable sectors; however, the boom did not last and the GDP growth for 2013 fell to 3.4% in 2013, and only slightly recovered to 4.5% in 2014.

According to government policies and economic reforms stated by Prime Minister and Minister of National Policy and economic affairs Ranil Wickremesinghe, Sri Lanka plans to create Western Region Megapolis a Megapolis in the western province to promote economic growth. The creation of several business and technology development areas island-wide specialised in various sectors, as well as tourism zones are also being planned. In the mid to late 2010s, Sri Lanka faced a danger of falling into economic malaise, with increasing debt levels and a political crisis which saw the country's debt rating being dropped.
In 2016 the government succeeded in lifting an EU ban on Sri Lankan fish products which resulted in fish exports to EU rising by 200% and in 2017 improving human rights conditions resulted in the European Commission proposing to restore GSP plus facility to Sri Lanka. Sri Lanka's tax revenues per GDP also increased from 10% in 2014, which was the lowest in nearly two decades to 12.3% in 2015. Despite reforms, Sri Lanka was listed among countries with the highest risk for investors by Bloomberg. Growth also further slowed to 3.3% in 2018 and 2.3% in 2019. The rupee fell from 131 to the US dollar to 182 from 2015 to 2019, inflating foreign debt and slowing domestic consumption ending a period of relative stability. China became a top creditor to Sri Lanka over the last decade, overtaking Japan and the World Bank.

The main economic sectors of the country are tourism, tea export, apparel, textile, rice production and other agricultural products. In addition to these economic sectors, overseas employment contributes highly in foreign exchange.

As of the early 2020s, the debt-laden country is undergoing an economic crisis where locals are experiencing months of shortages of food, fuel and electricity. Inflation has peaked to 57% according to official data. In June 2022, Prime Minister Ranil Wickremesinghe declared in parliament the collapse of the Sri Lankan economy, leaving it unable to pay for essentials.

Macroeconomic trends 
The chart below summarizes the trend of Sri Lanka's gross domestic product at market prices. by the International Monetary Fund with figures in millions of Sri Lankan Rupees.

For purchasing power parity comparisons, the US Dollar is exchanged at 113.4 Sri Lankan Rupees only.

The following table shows the main economic indicators in 1980–2020.

Trade statistics

Largest trading partners with Sri Lanka 
Exports $10.3 billion (2020)

Imports $14.9 billion (2020)

Economy

Sovereign Debt Crisis 2022 

After two years of money printing and tax cuts made for fiscal and monetary stimulus Sri Lanka declared a 'pre-emptive negotiated default' saying most foreign debt would not be repaid from April 12  Fitch Ratings downgraded Sri Lanka to 'C' from 'CC' and said the country would be further downgraded to restricted default (RD) once the first payment was missed. Standard and Poor's downgraded the sovereign rating to 'CC' and said the country would be downgraded to selective default (SD) after a payment was missed.

GDP growth 2021 and projections for 2022 

2020: -4, 2021: 4, 2022(f) 3 IMF

Sri Lanka's economy could grow 3% in 2022, the International Monetary Fund has said while warning that risk were on the downside and the economy could implode with trade contractions and monetary instability money printing (central bank credit) continued. In 2021 Sri Lanka grew 4% amid though excessive central bank financing had led to balance of payments deficits and foreign exchange shortages. Despite progress in managing Coronavirus, external debt remains a challenge amid concerns over money printing under Modern Monetary Theory independent economists had warned earlier. The central bank has said the economy is managed in an alternative way. The country's public and publicly guaranteed debt could rise to 115% in 2021 and poverty could worsen, the World Bank has warned.

Sri Lanka's gross domestic product contracted 4% in 2020 due to the government response to the Coronavirus pandemic which was higher than the previous contraction reported in 2001, on top of several years of slow growth and depreciation of the currency. Sri Lanka was making a strong recovery after lockdowns ended in May 2020 but a new outbreak of Coronavirus slowed exports and industry. The International Monetary Fund initially projected a 4.6-pct contraction for 2020.

In the second quarter of 2020 Sri Lanka's GDP was estimated to have contracted by 16% the biggest quarterly fall on record and expanded 2% in the third quarter. In the first nine months of the year, GDP was estimated to have contracted 5%.

After growing 5.0% in 2015, growth fell to 4% in 2016, 4% in 2017, 3% in 2018 and 2% in 2019.

The economy suffered a series of shocks in the form of a currency crisis which brought an International Monetary Fund program in 2016, political instability in 2018 combined with a second currency crisis and suicide bombings by an Islamist extremist group on Easter Sunday 2019.

Fiscal Developments

Budget deficit 2019: -6.8%/9.4%, 2020:11.1%/14%, 2021f: -9.4%

Sri Lanka is expecting a budget deficit of 9.4% of GDP in 2021, after the nominal output for the year was revised down following a Coronavirus pandemic in 2020.  A budget submitted to parliament originally expected a deficit of 8.9% in 2021 with a Coronavirus pandemic slowing growth, compounded by tax cuts. Concerns were raised that the targets were too ambitious given Coronavirus pandemic uncertainties as well as global economic weakness with Fitch Ratings projecting a deficit of 11.5%.

The Finance Ministry has countered saying a lower interest bill, a gradual recovery in 2021, stronger foreign direct investments to the Port City will strengthen economic activity and state finances. The Treasury also hopes to borrow more domestically instead of from abroad.

Sri Lanka's national debt has been gradually rising amid weak growth and policy gridlock. Following the steep rise in the deficit in 2020, central government debt rose to 101% of GDP. The debt to GDP ratio rose to 86.8% in 2019 from 77.9% in 2017.

Budget deficit data controversy

Sri Lanka's Ministry of Finance in 2020 changed its cash-basis accounting convention and charged some payment arrears to the previous year, reporting an 11.1% of GDP deficit for 2020 and revising up the 6.8 deficit in 2019 to 9.6%. Sri Lanka's main opposition charged that it was accounting fraud since arrears are always charged to the year it was paid under the country's cash-basis accounting convention. The deficit that was financed in 2020 was 14.0% of GDP. A Sri Lanka-based fact-checking portal, FactCheck.lk said the shift in numbers to 2019 "cannot be validated by an accounting standard."

Credit rating and commercial borrowing

Sri Lanka applied for credit ratings from international agencies in its efforts to apply for loans from international markets in 2005 after the election of Mahinda Rajapakse as president. Standard and Poor's gave Sri Lanka a "B+" speculative rating, four levels below investment grade and Fitch "BB−", three grades below investment grade. Standard and Poor's maintained Sri Lanka was constrained by providing widespread subsidies, a bloated public sector, transfers to loss-making state enterprises, and high interest local and international burdens . Standard and Poor's estimates public sector debt has reached 95% of GDP , in comparison to CIA estimates of 89% of GDP . Sri Lanka in mid-2007 sought to borrow $500 million from international markets to shore up the deteriorating exchange rate and reduce pressure on repayment of the domestic debt market . The head of the opposition UNP, Ranil Wickremasinghe has warned that such intense borrowing is unsustainable and will not repay these loans if elected to power .
Sri Lanka's credit rating was progressively downgraded following a series of currency crises and output shocks. In December 2018 Fitch downgraded Sri Lanka to 'B'  and in April 2020 to 'B−' amid a global Coronavirus pandemic.
Moody's downgraded Sri Lanka to Caa1 in September 2020, which was disputed by the Finance Ministry. In November 2020, Fitch Ratings also downgraded Sri Lanka to CCC citing fiscal and external concerns. In December 2020, Standard and Poor's followed, downgrading to 'CCC+', citing high fiscal deficits and excessive domestic liquidity, which was also protested by the Finance Ministry.

Investments

Sri Lanka's investment to GDP ratio is around 31%, made up of about 24% private and 5% public investment. The private savings rate is about 24% and the government is a net dis-saver leaving a domestic savings investment gap of around 7% of GDP. In 2019 investment fell to 27.4% of GDP from 30.4% a year earlier with the domestic savings rate also falling to 21.3% of GDP from 23%. Sri Lanka's savings rate is undermined by government dis-saving (the revenue deficit), which rose from 1.2 to 2.7% in 2019.

There are attempts to improve Sri Lanka's "Ease of Doing Business index' (Sri Lanka stood at 111 for 2018 down from 85th in 2014) and the overall tariff structure. In 1992, Sri Lanka's exports were on par with countries like Vietnam and Bangladesh (at US$2bn), which has only grown to US$12bn by end of 2017 compared to Vietnam's US$214bn and Bangladesh's US$36bn for 2017.

Inflation in 2021 

Colombo Consumer price inflation 2020 : 4.2% April 2021 : 3.9%

Inflation in Sri Lanka measured by the Colombo Consumer Price Index grew 6.0% in the 12-months to August 2021 picking up from 5.7 percent in July. Inflation was 4.2% in the year to December 2020. In 2019 inflation was 4.8 percent.

The Department of Census Statistics also compiles a National Consumer Price Index which is released with a delay. Inflation measured by the NCPI increased to 6.8% in July 2021 from 6.1% in June 2021, higher than the central banks target rate

Sri Lanka's central bank is targeting inflation at 4-6 per cent in 2021, though the policy will be loose to promote growth. "The Central Bank is of the view that continued support through monetary and fiscal interventions is essential to provide adequate impetus to the economy amidst the challenging domestic and global macroeconomic conditions," Governor W D Lakshman said in January 2021. "Therefore, the Central Bank will continue the prevailing accommodative monetary policy stance in 2021 to ensure the envisaged recovery of economic activity. The Central Bank will continue to remain vigilant but is confident that inflation will remain within the targeted range of 4-6 per cent over the medium-term. But after worsening balance of payments trouble and inflation, rates were hiked in August and the statutory reserve ratio was also raised.

Sri Lanka used a 'flexible inflation targeting' framework for monetary policy at least until 2019. In 2020 growth took a priority, Governor Lakshman has said as efforts are made to boost output amid a COVID-19 pandemic. Sri Lanka suffered a US$3.2bn balance of payments deficit in 2020 amid monetary easing.

Interest rates – 1 year T bill market rate by June 2019

12 Month T bill to be at 10% by 30 June 2019

The CBSL has reduced its T bill holding significantly from April 2017 to date reversing any monetary stimulated inflationary actions. Thus the resultant liquidity levels in the money market broadly reflect natural market conditions compared to the market that was there a year ago, which reflected more realistic banking sector interest rates as of June 2018. Private sector credit growth declined from high levels of 29% YoY in July 2016 to 15% YoY levels in 1Q2018.

Given the changes taking place in the private credit space (i.e. the retail tilt), and provided the CBSL's recent policy rate cut in April 2018, credit growth may still continue to move either horizontally (i.e. at a 15% level) or continue to reduce slightly given anticipated near term inflationary pressures, as the consumption-led borrowings may also tend to decline on account of the anticipated reduction in near term disposable income. This will however not add any excessive upward pressures on interest rates (including 12-month T bill yields) especially during 2H2018E. As a result, 12-month Treasury bill yields may in fact slightly decline from its June 2018 --> 9.4% to 9% levels by end of 2018E. However, given the International Sovereign Bond (ISB) bullet payments >US$3bn p.a. commencing from 2019E may likely add some upward pressure on interest rates, resulting in the 12-month T bill yields rising to at least 10% by 30 June 2019.

External sector

Trade account issues 

In the recent past, the Sri Lankan Government has identified some key focal areas to address the external imbalances of the economy, especially with regard to reducing its high trade deficit (~15% of GDP for 2012) in order to make the economy comply with the Marshall–Lerner condition. Sri Lanka's oil import bill accounts for an estimated 27% of total imports while its pro-growth policies have resulted in an investment goods import component of 24% of total imports. These inelastic import components have led to Sri Lanka's Export goods price elasticity + Import goods price elasticity totalling less than 1, resulting in the country not complying with the Marshall–Lerner condition.

Some of the suggested proposals include:
 Import substitution of investment goods and consumer goods
 Tax concessions towards value-added exports
 Negotiating longer credit periods for oil imports
 Allowing the external value of the currency to be determined by market forces (with minimal central bank intervention)

Capital account 
 Within the capital account, borrowings still account for a significant proportion as opposed to Foreign direct investments
 FDIs were estimated at ~US$800mn for FY2012

Overall balance (BOP) 
 The economy ended with an overall positive balance of US$151mn for 2012 (vs. a US$1,061mn deficit in FY2011)

Financial institutions 
The Central Bank of Sri Lanka is the monetary authority of Sri Lanka and was established in 1950. The Central Bank is responsible for the conduct of monetary policy in the country and also has supervisory powers over the financial system.

The Colombo Stock Exchange (CSE) is the main stock exchange in Sri Lanka. It is one of the most modern exchanges in South Asia, providing a fully automated trading platform. The vision of the CSE is to contribute to the wealth of the nation by creating value through securities. The headquarters of the CSE has been located at the World Trade Center Towers  in Colombo since 1995 and it also has branches across the country in Kandy, Matara, Kurunegala, Negombo and Jaffna. In 2009, after the 30 years-long civil war came to an end, the CSE was the best performing stock exchange in the world.

Economic infrastructure and resources

Transportation and roads 

Most Sri Lankan cities and towns are connected by the Sri Lanka Railways, the state-run railway operator. The Sri Lanka Transport Board is the state-run agency responsible for operating public bus services across the island.

The government has launched several highway projects to bolster the economy and national transport system, including the Colombo-Katunayake Expressway, the Colombo-Kandy (Kadugannawa) Expressway, the Colombo-Padeniya Expressway and the Outer Circular Highway to ease Colombo's traffic congestion. The government-sponsored Road Development Authority (RDA) has been involved in several large-scale projects all over the island in an attempt to improve the road network in Sri Lanka. Sri Lanka's commercial and economic centres, primarily the capitals of the nine provinces are connected by the "A-Grade" roads which are categorically organised and marked. Furthermore, "B-Grade" roads, also paved and marked, connect district capitals within provinces. The grand total of A, B and E grade roads are estimated at 12,379.49 km.

Energy 

The energy policy is governed by the Ministry of Power and Energy, while the production and retailing of electricity is carried out by the Ceylon Electricity Board. Policy recommendations and planning comes under the oversight of the Public Utilities Commission of Sri Lanka. Energy in Sri Lanka is mostly generated by hydroelectric power stations in the Central Province.

Skilled Labor 
Sri Lanka has a well-established education system that has successfully created a vast supply of skilled labour. Sri Lanka's population has a literacy rate of 92%, higher than that expected for a developing country; it has the highest literacy rate in South Asia and overall, one of the highest literacy rates in Asia. Information technology literacy of the urban sector population is also satisfactory at 39.9 per cent and people around the country use web-based job boards to find skilled employment together with other sources such as newspapers and government gazette. In Sri Lanka, all persons above the age limit 15 years and above of either gender are identified as the working-age population. In the fourth quarter of 2017, Sri Lanka had an unemployment rate of 4.2 percent and is shown to reduce gradually over the years.

Economic sectors

Tourism 

Tourism is one of the main industries in Sri Lanka. Major tourist attractions are focused around the islands famous beaches located in the southern and the eastern parts of the country and ancient heritage sites located in the interior of the country and resorts located in the mountainous regions of the country. Also, due to precious stones such as rubies and sapphires being frequently found and mined in Ratnapura and its surrounding areas, they are a major tourist attraction.

The 2004 Indian Ocean Tsunami and the past civil war have reduced the tourist arrivals, as a civil war intensified. Foreign visitors fell from 566,202 in 2004 during a ceasefire with Tamil Tiger separatists to 447,890 by the end of the war in 2009. From then arrivals grew rapidly to 2,333,796 in 2019. The 2019 Easter Sunday bombings reduced arrivals to 1,913,702 though authorities acted quickly to round up the group and travel advisories were relaxed by key generating markets such as UK as early as June 2019. Lonely Planet named Sri Lanka the best destination to visit in 2019 and Travel+Leisure the best island.

The COVID-19 pandemic dealt a major blow to the industry after airports were closed in March 2020. Tourism revenues were estimated to have fallen to US$956mn in 2020 from US$3.6bn in 2020 hurting over 300,000 said to be connected to the industry. The government has announced a number relief measures including a debt moratorium, which were then extended. In 2020 arrivals fell 70 percent to 507,704 from 1,913,702 in 2019, with almost all arrivals coming before airports closed in March. In December 2020, under what was called a 'pilot project' 393 package tourists came to Sri Lanka on a charter flights from Ukraine. On January 21 tourism resumed officially allowing independent travellers to also come subject to a series of health rules and Coronavirus tests.

Tea industry 

The tea industry, operating under the Ministry of Public Estate Management and Development, is one of the main industries in Sri Lanka. It became the world's leading exporter in 1995 with a 23% share of global tea export, higher than Kenya's 22% share. The central highlands of the country have a low-temperature climate throughout the year and annual rainfall and humidity levels that are suitable for growing tea. The industry was introduced to the country in 1867 by James Taylor, a British planter who arrived in 1852.

Recently, Sri Lanka has become one of the countries exporting fair trade tea to the UK and other countries. It is believed that such projects could reduce rural poverty.

Apparel and textile industry 

The apparel industry of Sri Lanka mainly exports to the United States and Europe. There are about 900 factories throughout country serving companies such as Victoria's Secret, Liz Claiborne and Tommy Hilfiger. Textiles & Apparels, as categorized and reported by the Sri Lanka Export Development Board, made up to around 44% of Sri Lankan merchandise exports, in the year 2017.

Agriculture 

The agricultural sector of the country produces mainly rice, coconut and grain, largely for domestic consumption and occasionally for export. The tea industry which has existed since 1867 is not usually regarded as part of the agricultural sector, which is mainly focused on export rather than domestic use in the country.

Sri Lanka's agricultural and agri-allied manufacturing is likely affected by climate variations. There was a flood in May 2018 followed by floods in May 2016 and May 2017.

Transition to biological agriculture 

In June 2021, Sri Lanka started the first 100% organic farming or biological agriculture program and imposed a countrywide ban on inorganic fertilizers and pesticides. The program was welcomed by its advisor Vandana Shiva, but ignored critical voices from scientific and farming community who warned about possible collapse of farming, including financial crisis due to devaluation of national currency pivoted around tea industry. In the autumn of 2021 Sri-Lanka experienced massive drop in farming output by up to 50% and food shortages. The situation in the tea industry was described as critical, with farming under the organic program being described as 10x more expensive and producing half of the yield by the farmers. In September 2021 the government announced "economic emergency", as the situation was further aggravated by falling national currency exchange rate, inflation rising as result of high food prices, and pandemic restrictions in tourism which further decreased country's income. The government cancelled some of these measures, but importing urea remains banned. Sri Lanka is seeking to introduce peacetime rationing of essential goods.

In mid-October 2021 the ban was largely lifted "until the island was able to produce enough organic fertiliser". In November 2021, Sri Lanka abandoned its plan to become the world's first organic farming nation following rising food prices and weeks of protests against the plan. As of December 2021, the damage to the agricultural production was already done, with prices having risen substantially for vegetables in Sri Lanka, and time needed to recover from the crisis. The ban on fertilizer has been lifted for certain crops, but the price of urea has risen internationally due to the price for oil and gas. Jeevika Weerahewa, a senior lecturer at the University of Peradeniya, predicted that the ban would reduce the paddy harvest in 2022 by an unprecedented 50%.

IT industry 

The export revenue from the Sri Lankan IT sector was US$1,089 million in 2019.

Mining 

Sri Lanka is known for producing a variety of gemstones, including chrysoberyl, corundum, garnet, ruby, spinel, and tourmaline, and is a leading producer of the Ceylon Blue sapphire. The best known areas for gemstone mining in Sri Lanka were Balangoda, Elahera, Kamburupitiya, Moneragala, Okkampitiya, and Ratnapura. In addition Sri Lanka has a variety of industrial minerals, which include ball clay, kaolin, and other clays, calcite, dolomite, feldspar, graphite, limestone, Ilmenite, mica, rutile mineral sands, phosphate rock, quartz, zircon, dolomite and silica sand. Pulmoddai beach sand deposit is the most important non-ferrous mineral reserve in Sri Lanka as well as one of the world's most richest mineral sand deposits with heavy mineral concentrates of 50% to 60% and contain manyminerals including titanium.

Sri Lanka is famous specially for its highly valued and high-purity vein graphite. As of 2014, graphite was produced at the two largest graphite mines in Sri Lanka, the Bogala and the Kahatagaha Mines. Major investors in graphite mining are Graphite Lanka Ltd., Bogala Graphite Lanka Plc, Bora Bora Resources Ltd. (BBR) of Australia, MRL Corp. Ltd. of Australia, and Saint Jean Carbon Inc. of Canada.

Major companies
Sri Lanka has developed several multi-national companies and international brands. The most notable conglomerate include Cargills, JKH, Hayleys, LOLC Holdings and Softlogic Holdings. The largest apparel companies are [[KMS Group], [MAS Holdings]], Brandix. While LAUGFS Holdings is a notable company in the energy sector. A well known hospitality conglomerate is Aitken Spence. Dilmah and Island Tea are both a well known tea brand. While consumer goods brands include Ceylon Tobacco Company, Elephant House, DCSL, CBL, Maliban and GRI Tires.

Global economic relations 
Exports to the United States, Sri Lanka's most important market, were valued at $1.8 billion in 2002, or 38% of total exports. For many years, the United States has been Sri Lanka's largest market for garments, receiving more than 63% of the country's total garment exports. India is Sri Lanka's largest supplier, with imports worth $835 million in 2002. Japan, traditionally Sri Lanka's largest supplier, was its fourth-largest in 2002 with exports of $355 million. Other important suppliers include Hong Kong, Singapore, Taiwan, and South Korea. The United States is the 10th-largest supplier to Sri Lanka; US imports amounted to $218 million in 2002, according to Central Bank trade data.

A new port is being built in Hambantota in Southern Sri Lanka, funded by the Chinese government as a part of the Chinese aid to Sri Lanka. This will ease the congestion in Sri Lankan ports, particularly in Colombo. In 2009, 4456 ships visited Sri Lankan ports.

Trade agreements

Foreign assistance 
Sri Lanka is highly dependent on foreign assistance, and several high-profile assistance projects were launched in 2003. The most significant of these resulted from an aid conference in Tokyo in June 2003; pledges at the summit, which included representatives from the International Monetary Fund, World Bank, Asian Development Bank, Japan, the European Union and the United States, totalled $4.5 billion.

Debt and IMF assistance 

During the years before 2016, the country's debt has soared as it was developing its infrastructure to the point of near bankruptcy which required a bailout from the International Monetary Fund (IMF). "Without an IMF loan, Sri Lanka would have been in a precarious position" in May 2016, according to Krystal Tan, an Asia economist at Capital Economics, who added "foreign exchange reserves only covered around 80 per cent of short-term external debt." The IMF had agreed to provide a $1.5 billion bailout loan in April 2016 after Sri Lanka provided a set of criteria intended to improve its economy.

By the fourth quarter of 2016, the debt was estimated to be $64.9 billion. Additional debt had been incurred in the past by state-owned organizations and this was said to be at least $9.5 billion. Since early 2015, domestic debt has increased by 12 per cent and external debt by 25 per cent.

In late 2016 the World Bank provided US$100 million in financing and the Japan International Cooperation Agency provided a US$100M loan, both intended to "provide budget financing and to support reforms in competitiveness, transparency, public sector and fiscal management", according to the World Bank. The bank also reported that the country's government had agreed that there was a need for reforms "in the areas of fiscal operations, competitiveness and governance" and if fully implemented, "these could help the country reach Upper Middle-Income status in the medium term" according to the bank.

In November 2016, the International Monetary Fund reported that it would disburse a higher amount than the US$150 million originally planned, a full US$162.6 million (SDR 119.894 million), to Sri Lanka. The agency's evaluation was cautiously optimistic about the future: "While inflation has abated, credit growth remains strong. The central bank indicates its readiness to tighten the monetary policy stance further if inflationary pressures resurge or credit growth persists. The authorities intend to continue building up reserves through outright purchases while allowing for greater exchange rate flexibility. The banking sector is currently well capitalized. Steps are being taken to find a resolution mechanism for the distressed financial institutions. Going forward, there is a need to strengthen the supervisory and regulatory framework, and identify and mitigate vulnerabilities in the financial sector, particularly with regard to non-banks and state-owned banks."

As part of the debt management program, the Sri Lankan government carried out several reforms which included the implementation of a new Inland Revenue Act as well as an automatic fuel pricing formula. Tax reforms also increased VAT rates and narrowed exemptions and the third review by the IMF noted that performance was on track regarding fiscal consolidation, revenue mobilization, monetary policy management, and reserves accumulation. In the fourth review in June 2018, the IMF claimed that "Sri Lanka has made important progress under its Fund-supported program", but stressed the need for further progress with revenue-based fiscal consolidation and a prudent monetary policy with sustained efforts to build up international reserves. In 2018 China extended a loan of $1.25 billion consisting of a below-market-rate syndicated loan and smaller Panda bond to bail out Sri Lanka.

In 2021, Bangladesh agreed to give Sri Lanka loans of at least $200 million from the foreign exchange reserves under a currency swap deal. The currency swap initiative was taken after Sri Lankan Prime Minister Mahinda Rajapaksa’s visit to Bangladesh to attend the joint celebrations of the golden jubilee of Bangladesh's independence and the birth centenary of Bangabandhu. In December 2021, Sri Lanka announced that it would pay off a $251 million oil debt to Iran by sending $5 million worth of Ceylon tea every month.

See also 
 List of companies of Sri Lanka
 Central Bank of Sri Lanka
 2019–present Sri Lankan economic crisis
 Colombo Stock Exchange

References

Notes

External links 
 Global Economic Prospects: Growth Prospects for South Asia The World Bank, 13 December 2006
 World Bank Trade Summary Statistics Sri Lanka 2012
 CSE ALL-SHARE
 CIA Factbook
 
 Company registration in Sri Lanka
 Information and News

 
Economics in developing countries
Sri Lanka